Psara orphnopeza is a moth in the family Crambidae. It was described by John Frederick Gates Clarke in 1986. It is found on the Marquesas Islands.

References

Spilomelinae
Moths described in 1986